Automated code review software checks source code for compliance with a predefined set of rules or best practices. The use of analytical methods to inspect and review source code to detect bugs or security issues has been a standard development practice in both Open Source and commercial software domains. This process can be accomplished both manually and in an automated fashion. With automation, software tools provide assistance with the code review and inspection process. The review program or tool typically displays a list of warnings (violations of programming standards). A review program can also provide an automated or a programmer-assisted way to correct the issues found. This is a component for mastering easily software. This is contributing to the Software Intelligence practice. This process is usually called "linting" since one of the first tools for static code analysis was called Lint.

Some static code analysis tools can be used to help with automated code review. They do not compare favorably to manual reviews, however they can be done faster and more efficiently. These tools also encapsulate deep knowledge of underlying rules and semantics required to perform this type analysis such that it does not require the human code reviewer to have the same level of expertise as an expert human auditor. Many Integrated Development Environments also provide basic automated code review functionality. For example the Eclipse and Microsoft Visual Studio IDEs support a variety of plugins that facilitate code review.

Next to static code analysis tools, there are also tools that analyze and visualize software structures and help humans to better understand these. Such systems are geared more to analysis because they typically do not contain a predefined set of rules to check software against. Some of these tools (e.g. Imagix 4D, Resharper, SonarJ, Sotoarc, Structure101, ACTool) allow one to define target architectures and enforce that target architecture constraints are not violated by the actual software implementation.

Automated code review tools

See also
 Program analysis (computer science)

References

Static program analysis tools
Software review